Pabitra Mohan Dey (পবিত্র মোহন দে ) (born 1 May 1937) is a Bangladeshi tabla player. He was awarded 2016 Shilpakala Padak by the Government of Bangladesh for his contribution to instrumental music  and won the Independence Award in 2023 for his contribution to the field of cultural.

Early life and career
Dey was born on 1 May 1937(বাংলাঃ ১৮ই বৈশাখ ,১৩৪৪ বঙ্গাব্দ) in Chukaitola, Akua, Mymensingh. He took tabla lessons from his elder brother Mithun Dey.

Dey is serving as a tabla teacher at Bangladesh Agricultural University (BAU) Sangeet Bidhalaya.

Awards
 "Rabindra Padak"" by Jatiya Rabindra Sangeet Sammilan Parishad (2009)
 Shilpakala Padak by Bangladesh Shilpakala Academy (2016)

References

Living people
1937 births
People from Mymensingh District
Tabla players
Bangladeshi male musicians

Recipients of the Independence Day Award